Fraus linogyna is a moth of the family Hepialidae. It is endemic to New South Wales and Victoria.

References

Moths described in 1989
Hepialidae